Rear-Admiral Horatio Nelson Lay  (23 January 1903 in Skagway, District of Alaska, United States – 1988 in Perth, Ontario) was a naval officer of the Royal Canadian Navy.

Career

Early career
In 1918 he was a Naval Cadet at the Royal Naval College of Canada. In 1921 he was made a midshipman and assigned to the battleship  for training.

In 1924 he was sent to the Royal Naval College, Greenwich and RN Barracks Portsmouth for sub-lieutenant courses. His next assignments were to the destroyer  in 1925. He transferred to the battlecruiser  for big ship experience prior to a torpedo course in 1927. Lay was assigned to the battlecruiser  for further experience in 1928. He was then made Torpedo Officer Atlantic Coast in 1930.

In 1931 Lay was assigned to the destroyer . In 1933, he was made Torpedo Officer Pacific Coast. Lay was assigned to the destroyer  as first lieutenant in 1934. Lay was returned to Torpedo Officer Pacific Coast in 1937. He was then sent on a Royal Naval Staff course in 1938.

Second World War
He became the first Commanding Officer of the minesweeper  from 12 January 1939 to 17 August 1939 and as Staff Officer Operations to Commanding Officer Atlantic Coast. His next command was as Commanding Officer of the destroyer  from 26 December 1939 to 23 June 1941. He was then made Director of Operations from June 1941 to October 1943.

Twenty-one crew were killed in the attack. Nabob was paid off on 30 September 1944, beached and finally scrapped in 1977.

He was next sent to Canadian Naval Mission Overseas London for negotiations with the Royal Navy for aircraft carriers in 1945. Lay was then sent to the US Army/US Navy Staff College and to Naval Service HQ as Director of Plans and Naval Intelligence.

Cold War and civilian life
In 1948 Lay became Acting Commodore and sent to Naval HQ as Assistant Chief of Naval Staff (Plans and Air). The following year he was made Canadian Naval Attache Washington and Naval member of the Canadian Joint Liaison Staff. In 1952, Lay was assigned to Naval HQ as Assistant Chief of Naval Staff (Warfare) and made a member of the Naval Board of Canada. He was promoted to rear admiral and assigned to Naval HQ as Vice-Chief of Naval Staff and as Chief of the Naval Staff in 1954, serving until his retirement in 1958.

After retirement, he was active in the Ottawa United Appeal from 1958 to 1972.

Awards
 Order of the British Empire (OBE) - "For gallantry and distinguished services before the enemy. This Officer was in command of one of HMC Destroyers engaged in convoy and other duties in United Kingdom waters in the early part of the war, and assisted in the evacuations from France. As Senior Officer of a convoy escort group in the Atlantic over a considerable period, his keenness and efficiency were an inspiration to those serving under his command."
 Mention in Despatches -  "For good service when his ship HMS Nabob was damaged." "For courage, resolution and skill in Northern waters (London Gazette Citation)."

References
 
 

1903 births
1988 deaths
Canadian admirals
Military personnel from Alaska
Graduates of the Royal Naval College, Greenwich
Naval War College alumni
United States Army Command and General Staff College alumni
Royal Canadian Navy personnel of World War II
People from the Municipality of Skagway Borough, Alaska
Canadian Officers of the Order of the British Empire